Bryce Bennett (born July 14, 1992) is an American World Cup alpine ski racer and specializes in the downhill event.

He joined the U.S. Ski Team in 2011 after a spring tryout camp and, though he missed out on the 2014 Olympic team, he saw his breakout season come in 2015. In December of that year, Bennett went from the 57th starting position to cross the finish line in sixth at a World Cup downhill in Val Gardena, Italy, for his first top ten.  He has competed in three World Championships and two Winter Olympics.

World Cup results

Season standings

Top ten finishes
1 win – (1 DH)
1 podium – (1 DH), 17 top tens – (13 DH, 1 SG, 3 AC)

World Championship results

Olympic results

References

Photos:
 https://www.gettyimages.com/detail/news-photo/skier-bryce-bennett-competes-in-the-fis-alpine-world-cup-news-photo/899272792
 http://www.cnn.com/interactive/2017/12/specials/year-in-pictures/

ARTICLES:
 https://usskiandsnowboard.org/news/bryce-bennett-us-ski-team-yeti-whatmakesachamp
 https://usskiandsnowboard.org/news/bennett-top-american-birds-prey
 http://videos.ussa.org/alpine/detail/videos/downhill/video/5281109830001/bryce-bennett-alpine-combined-run-2-downhill---wengen-2017
 https://www.teamusa.org/News/2018/January/12/Born-To-Skiing-Families-Bryce-Bennett-And-Ryan-Cochran-Siegle-Are-Headed-To-PyeongChang-Olympics
 https://www.skiracing.com/premium/bryce-bennett-on-the-rise
 https://www.sierrasun.com/news/sports/travis-ganong-bryce-bennett-post-u-s-ski-teams-top-times/
 http://tahoequarterly.com/outdoors/big-man-on-the-rise
 https://www.theunion.com/news/sports/squaw-skier-bryce-bennett-clinches-downhill-title/

External links

 
 Bryce Bennett at the U.S. Ski Team

1992 births
Living people
American male alpine skiers
Alpine skiers at the 2018 Winter Olympics
Alpine skiers at the 2022 Winter Olympics
Olympic alpine skiers of the United States